Marinos Kontaras, also known as The Corsair of the Aegean, is a 1948 Greek film written and directed by George Tzavellas, adapted from a short story of Argyris Eftaliotis. It was the first Greek film to be selected in an international festival (Experimental Film festival of Knokke-Heist).

Plot
Marinos Kontaras (Manos Katrakis) is a pirate in the Aegean who falls in love with Lemoni and abducts her. She demands that he forswear piracy. He accepts and reconciles with his enemies, including the brother of Lemoni (Vasilis Diamantopoulos).

External links

Marinos Kontaras at Greek Film Archive

1948 films
Films directed by George Tzavellas
Pirate films
1940s romance films
Greek black-and-white films